Pascal Potié (born 15 March 1964) is a French former cyclist. He competed at the 1984, 1988 and 1992 Summer Olympics.

References

External links
 

1964 births
Living people
People from Seclin
French male cyclists
Olympic cyclists of France
Cyclists at the 1984 Summer Olympics
Cyclists at the 1988 Summer Olympics
Cyclists at the 1992 Summer Olympics
French track cyclists
Sportspeople from Nord (French department)
Cyclists from Hauts-de-France
20th-century French people